Beverley Ann Bainbridge (née Spargo; 28 January 1940 – 9 May 2016) was an Australian swimmer. She competed in the women's 100 metre butterfly at the 1956 Summer Olympics.

Bainbridge died on 9 May 2016, aged 76.

References

External links
 

1940 births
2016 deaths
Olympic swimmers of Australia
Swimmers at the 1956 Summer Olympics
Place of birth missing
Commonwealth Games medallists in swimming
Commonwealth Games gold medallists for Australia
Commonwealth Games silver medallists for Australia
Australian female butterfly swimmers
Swimmers at the 1958 British Empire and Commonwealth Games
20th-century Australian women
21st-century Australian women
Medallists at the 1958 British Empire and Commonwealth Games